Anatolie Topală (born 27 October 1970) is the Minister of Education and Research of the Republic of Moldova.

Note

1970 births
Living people
People from Călărași District
Government ministers of Moldova